Elizabethtown, once known as Bugtown, is a ghost town located about fifteen miles southwest of Denton in Denton County, Texas, United States. The town derived its original name from the adjacent Elizabeth Creek. The creek starts in northeast Roanoke and ends near Rhome, Haslet, and  Avondale.

History
The town site was located in the southeast corner of George W. Shamblin Survey #1191. Its first residents, members of the Peters Colony arrived c. 1850. Elizabethtown served as a supply station in 1852, mostly for cowboys driving their herds to Kansas. The town founders, the Harmonsons, constructed a church, homes, a business, and a school. At its height the school had 25 students. In 1859 the town had six saloons, a hotel and a post office, a staple of all true towns. According to residents of nearby Justin, Texas, Elizabethtown was once known as Bugtown after so many bugs swarmed in on a camp meeting one night that the preaching had to be stopped.

During the American Civil War the frontier in and west of Denton County remained undefended against Indian resistance, many families moved east during this time period. Later, though, many did return. As the town grew it gained four general stores, another hotel and a livery stable, along with Baptist and Methodist churches, and a Masonic lodge that operated from 1873 to 1876.

The schoolhouse included in the town formed its own school district, Elizabethtown School District #58, which was created in 1884. The school district didn't last for long. By 1946, Elizabethtown School District consolidated with Roanoke and surrounding districts. This formed the creation of Northwest Independent School District in 1949. The old school house is gone, and the cemetery stands in its place. A Texas Historical Marker currently stands next to Elizabethtown Cemetery.

Prominent residents
George Harper: doctor and postmaster
M.H. Smith: blacksmith
Newton Chance: blacksmith                                                 
Amos Bullard: blacksmith
Sewell Brown: merchant
James Snyder: wagonmaker
Robert Wright: carpenter
Barry Allen: courier

Decline
Elizabethtown last appeared on the Denton County tax roll in 1880. The Texas and Pacific Railway, which was built in 1881 from Fort Worth through Denton County, bypassed Elizabethtown by just two miles. Many residents subsequently moved two miles east to the newly established town of Roanoke, along with their businesses, churches and the Masonic lodge. The only remnant of Elizabethtown is the Elizabeth Cemetery, which is still in use today. Everything else in the town is gone, and the area remains a muddy field that is currently open for lease off of Highway 114.

Geography 
The site of the former town is by the Elizabeth Creek, near Interstate 35 at State Highway 114. The cemetery is in the southeast corner of the ghost town, off of Elizabethtown Cemetery Road. Although the town is no longer there, the name "Elizabethtown" is shown on Google Maps to be near the Texas Motor Speedway. The zip code for the area is 76262.

Notes

External links
 
 Handbook of Texas Online
  Ghost towns

Geography of Denton County, Texas
Ghost towns in North Texas
Populated places established in 1852
1852 establishments in Texas